Max Design GesMBH was an Austrian video game developer based in Schladming, founded in 1991 by Wilfried Reiter Albert and Martin Lasser. The company is best known for creating the Anno series. The company was closed down in 2004.

Company history 
Max Design was founded in 1991 by the brothers Albert Lasser and Martin Lasser together with Wilfried Reiter.

The company became known for its challenging business simulation games that attract a large fan following to this day, and in the 1990s it significantly influenced the image of the "typically German business simulation" as a separate game genre with its series History Experience, together with games such as The Patrician (Ascaron).

The game Anno 1602, initiated by Max Design and later published together with Sunflowers, marked an important boundary in two respects. On the one hand, with 2 million copies sold, it became the most successful German / Austrian computer game ever and it laid the foundation for the Anno series. On the other hand, Sunflowers secured the first shares in Max Design as part of the cooperation. With the appearance of Anno 1503, there was speculation in the fan base about a continual shift in the balance of power towards Sunflowers.

After twelve years Max Design left the game industry on April 15, 2004. As per press release this is a matter of an adjustment phase whose duration is uncertain. All employees except the founding members were laid off. In the same year the company fully ceased all its activities. The Anno-series was continued – while under its control – by Sunflowers in cooperation with Related Designs.

In an interview, one of the company's founder later declared that, after twelve years of development, the core team was "tired" and needed some time for a re-orientation.

List of developed or released games 
 Think Cross (1991) - (Atari ST/E, Commodore 64/128) – Puzzle
 Cash (1991) - (Amiga ECS/OCS) – Business simulation game
 Osiris (1992) - (DOS) – Puzzle
 Hunt The Fonts (1992) - Puzzle
 1869 - Hart am Wind! (1992) - Business simulation game
 also known as 1869: Erlebte Geschichte Teil I
 English name: 1869: History Experience Part I
 Burntime (1993) - (Amiga, DOS) – Strategy game
 Der Clou! (1994) – (Amiga ECS/OCS, AGA, CD³²) – Adventure
 English name The Clue
 Oldtimer (1994/95) - (Amiga ECS/OCS, AGA, DOS) – Business simulation game
 also known as Oldtimer: Erlebte Geschichte Teil II
 English name Motor City
 Clearing House (1995) - Stock market simulation game
 Strike Base (1996) - Space-Action
 Anno 1602 (1998) - (Windows) – Business simulation game/Strategy
 (Developer/Publisher: Sunflowers Interactive Entertainment Software)
 Anno 1503 (2002) - (Windows) – Business simulation game/Strategy
 (Developer/Publisher: Max Design/Sunflowers)

Other 
The soundtrack for 1869 and Burntime was written by Hannes Seifert, one of the later founders and CEO's of Neo Software, who also made the music on several other games at this time. Max Design also published the successful Der Clou!.

With Petko, Max Design tried in the middle of the nineties to place an adventure. A playable demo was still released but the game has never gone gold.

Literature 
 Max Design In: Winnie Forster: Lexikon der Computer- und Videospielmacher. Erste Auflage,  S. 200. .

References

External links 
 Gesammelte Testberichte zu Spielen von Max Design (ger)

Video game companies established in 1991
Video game companies disestablished in 2004
Defunct video game companies of Austria
Video game development companies
1991 establishments in Austria